Heathrow Airport is an international airport in London, England.

Heathrow may also refer to:

Places

Currently
Heathrow, Florida, a suburban community in the United States
Heathrow Villages, an electoral ward in Hayes and Harlington UK Parliament constituency, and a ward in Hillingdon Borough

Until summer 1944
Heathrow (hamlet), a hamlet destroyed in 1944 during construction of Heathrow Airport
Heathrow Aerodrome or Great West Aerodrome, facility that became Heathrow Airport

Transport facilities serving Heathrow Airport
Heathrow Airside Road Tunnel, a road tunnel connecting the central airport area to Terminal 5
Heathrow Airtrack, a proposed train service
Heathrow Cargo Tunnel, a road tunnel connecting the central airport area to the cargo terminal
Heathrow Connect, a former train service to the airport 
Heathrow Express, a train service
London Underground stations:
Heathrow Terminals 2 & 3 tube station
Heathrow Terminal 4 tube station
Heathrow Terminal 5 station
National Rail stations:
Heathrow Central railway station
Heathrow Terminal 4 railway station
Heathrow Terminal 5 station
Heathrow Junction railway station, a former station serving the airport

Other uses
"Heathrow", a song by Level 42 on the album Level 42
"Heathrow", a song by the Catfish and the Bottlemen on their 2016 album, The Ride
Heathrow Airport Holdings Limited, formerly BAA, the United Kingdom-based operator of Heathrow Airport

See also

Heathored, name of some Anglo-Saxon-period English men
Heathwick, an informal name for a proposal to create a high-speed rail link between London's Heathrow and Gatwick airports
Row Heath, a hamlet on Rectory Road in the Tendring district, in the county of Essex, England